T35, T.35, T 35 or T-35 may refer to:
 ,  a German warship of World War II
 T-35 Buckaroo, a 1950 extremely low-cost trainer for commercial and export markets
 T-35 Pillán, a 1991 Chilean propeller-driven basic trainer aircraft
 T-35, a 1935 Soviet multi-turret heavy tank
 Bugatti Type 35, a 1926 racing car
 Slingsby T.35 Austral, a British glider
 T35 (classification), a para-athletics classification for track athletes with cerebral palsy
 T35, a 1940s prototype for the United States M10 tank destroyer
 T35, a turboprop version of the Lockheed J37 jet engine
 T 35, a modified two-seat training version of the 1945 de Havilland Vampire aircraft
 T35, the station number of Nagahara Station, Osaka, Japan

See also
 T3.5, shortened name of 3-Chloro-6-(2-diethylamino-ethoxy)-10-(2-diethylamino-ethyl)-acridone, an antimalarial drug